The First Blyth Ministry was the 12th Ministry of the Government of South Australia, led by Arthur Blyth. It commenced on 4 August 1864, when Blyth succeeded in forming a ministry following the resignation of the Second Ayers Ministry. It was succeeded by the Second Dutton Ministry on 22 March 1865, when Francis Dutton won the support of the new parliament that had been elected at the 1865 election.

References

Blyth 1